Bohuslav Kirchmann (born 15 April 1902, date of death unknown) was a Czech fencer. He competed in five events at the 1936 Summer Olympics.

References

1902 births
Year of death missing
Czech male fencers
Czechoslovak male fencers
Olympic fencers of Czechoslovakia
Fencers at the 1936 Summer Olympics